The 1949 South Dakota Coyotes football team was an American football team that represented the University of South Dakota as a member of the North Central Conference (NCC) during the 1949 college football season. In their 12th season under head coach Harry Gamage, the Coyotes compiled a 2–5–2 record (2–2–2 against NCC opponents), finished in fifth place out of seven teams in the NCC, and were outscored by a total of 199 to 163. They played their home games at Inman Field in Vermillion, South Dakota.

Schedule

References

South Dakota
South Dakota Coyotes football seasons
South Dakota Coyotes football